Lavalantula is an American 2015 science fiction comedy horror thriller television film that takes place after a series of volcanic eruptions in Los Angeles unleashes a swarm of gigantic, lava-breathing tarantulas from which the film draws its title. It was directed by Mike Mendez and stars Steve Guttenberg, Nia Peeples and Patrick Renna. Ian Ziering appears as Fin Shepard, tying the film into the Sharknado universe. It premiered on Syfy on July 25, 2015.

Plot
A-list actor Colton West has an argument with Darren the film director, and storms off in his car. An earthquake hits, and Colton sees the Santa Monica Mountains erupt, spewing volcanic bombs all around him. A large fire-spitting spider comes out of the car in front of him. Colton runs and drives out of the traffic back onto the main road to escape.

Colton arrives home, and tells his wife Olivia about the giant spiders and that they need to leave. He takes a shotgun from his house and drives off in his car to find his son Wyatt, who had left the house under the guise of going to a soccer game.

In reality, Wyatt is out with his friends Jordan, Eli and Travis when they hear an explosion and see much smoke in the distance, and go to investigate. The teenagers find the source of the explosion to be a sink hole. Spiders come out of the hole spitting fire and start attacking people. Terrified, the teenagers flee to a warehouse, but Eli is caught by a spider and killed.

Colton's car is damaged when he hits a lava sinkhole. He gets out and finds a tour bus full of people further up the road. He tricks the driver and steals the bus. As he is driving, a spider jumps onto the bus. He brakes heavily and the spider falls off the front of the bus, after which he runs it over. The front of the tour bus starts dissolving because of the spider's blood being acidic. Colton stops the bus and evacuates it just before it blows up.

A spider comes down the chimney in Olivia's house but she shoots it. The army starts moving into the city, and they rescue Olivia from her house.

Colton gets a lift from his friend, Pirate Jack, a film stunt man. Jack's car gets a puncture after hitting a lava vein in the road. Spiders come out of sink holes and chase them into a museum. They meet a scientist in the museum, who is researching the spiders and the volcano. He works out that the spiders were buried in the magma millions of years ago. Because the spiders became active, they are causing the volcanic eruptions, and that the only way to stop them is to kill the Queen spider.

A spider gets in through a window in the warehouse where the teenagers are hiding and tries to attack them. Wyatt fights the spider with a fire extinguisher. Jordan, who was burnt earlier, has a fit and dies. Then loads of baby spiders crawl out of her as she catches fire. The baby spiders then attack Travis, setting him on fire and killing him. Wyatt runs to the roof of the warehouse where he gets a phone signal and texts his location to Colton.

The spiders attack the army truck Olivia is in, she hides under a fire blanket as they breathe fire inside the truck. The soldiers all get killed and Olivia kills the spider and drives off in the army truck to try and find Colton.

Meanwhile, the spiders break into the museum. Jack is killed, but Colton manages to escape. Olivia finds Colton and they drive off to rescue Wyatt.

Wyatt climbs off the roof of the warehouse, and is attacked by a spider. Olivia and Colton arrive and run over the spider with the Army truck. Colton realizes that liquid nitrogen can be used to fight the spiders. They all go to the special effects store, where Colton finds his colleagues from the film set.

Colton makes a plan to kill the queen spider with a liquid nitrogen bomb, made using items from the special effects store. He leaves with his film crew, to drop the bombs into the queen’s underground chamber. They plant the bombs around the chamber and detonate them. Many spiders come out of sinkholes to the surface. The film crew shoots them all down. Then, the giant queen spider comes to the surface. Colton uses a jet pack from the film set and flies off a building towards the queen spider. He drops a nitrogen bomb into the spider's mouth, killing it and saving the city.

Cast
 Steve Guttenberg as Colton West, a former A-List actor
 Nia Peeples as Olivia West, Colton West's wife
 Patrick Renna as Chris, a tourist
 Michael Winslow as Marty, part of the film crew
 Marion Ramsey as Teddie, part of the film crew
 Leslie Easterbrook as Doris, Olivia's friend
 Ralph Garman as Pirate Jack, an ex-film stunt man
 Danny Woodburn as Arni, Colton West's agent
 Noah Hunt as Wyatt West, Colton West's son
 Diana Hopper as Jordan, a friend of Wyatt
 Time Winters as Dr. Eric Von Struble, a scientist
 Ian Ziering as Fin Shepard, main character from Sharknado
 Zac Goodspeed as Travis, a friend of Wyatt 
 Ben Snowden as Eli, a friend of Wyatt
 Felisha Cooper as Britney, Arni's assistant

Sequel
A sequel to Lavalantula called 2 Lava 2 Lantula premiered on Syfy on August 6, 2016. Some of the cast from the original film returned, including Steve Guttenberg, Marion Ramsey and Michael Winslow.

References

External links
 

2015 television films
2015 films
2015 horror films
2010s science fiction horror films
2015 horror thriller films
CineTel Films films
Syfy original films
Films shot in Los Angeles
Films set in Los Angeles
Films about spiders
2010s monster movies
American monster movies
American science fiction horror films
Giant monster films
Sharknado (film series)
American comedy horror films
American science fiction comedy films
American comedy television films
American science fiction television films
2010s American films